Atomico is a European Venture Capital firm headquartered in London, with offices in Paris, and Stockholm. Its founder and CEO is Niklas Zennström, a serial entrepreneur who co-founded Skype and Kazaa.

History and investments 
It has invested in more than 130 companies across the globe via 4 funds, Atomico Ventures I, the $165 million Atomico Ventures II, Atomico III, which closed at $476 million in November 2013[3] and most recently the $765 million Atomico IV.

The company has been involved with exits or substantial transactions in companies including Supercell (sold a majority stake to SoftBank, valuing the business at $3 billion in 2013), The Climate Corporation (acquired by Monsanto for $1.1 billion in 2013), Xobni (acquired by Yahoo! in 2013), PowerReviews (acquired by Bazaarvoice in 2012) and Rovio's $1 billion IPO in September 2017.

Investments
The firm's investments include

Europe
6WunderKinder
Graphcore
Lilium
Infarm
Truecaller
Framer
MessageBird
Varjo
Omio (previously GoEuro)
Pipedrive
Scandit
HealX
Spacemaker
Kheiron Medical
Betable
Chemist Direct
EVRYTHNG
Farmdrop
AccuRx
Fashiolista
Fon
Habito
Hailo
Jolicloud
Klarna
Last.fm
LendInvest
Star
Mydeco
OneTwoTrip
Ostrovok
Playfire
Quipper
Rovio Mobile
Seesmic
Siine
Silk
Scoutbee
Skype
State
Supercell
Uniplaces
Viagogo
Wrapp
Zattikka

North America
Masterclass
Clutter
Lime
Compass
Stripe
Deca
Fab.com
Fabricly
Heysan
Jawbone
Knewton
Kyte
Memolane
PowerReviews
Quid
Rdio
Technorati
The Climate Corporation
TrialPay
Upside Foods
Xobni

South America
Gympass
Bebestore
CinemaKi
Connect Parts
Pedidos Ya
Restorando

Asia
Smartnews
CMUNE
Gengo
iBoxPay

See also
 List of venture capital firms

References

External links
Atomico (company website)

Venture capital firms of the United Kingdom